The Buldyrty is a river in the West Kazakhstan Region, Kazakhstan.

The Buldyrty belongs to the Ural basin and flows across the Syrym, Karatobe and Shyngyrlau districts. The banks of the river are a seasonal grazing ground for local cattle. The name of the river originated in the Kazakh word for turbid or murky.

Course 
The Buldyrty begins at the confluence of two small rivers, the Bylkyldagan and Zhosaly, close to Aksuat village. It heads in a southwestward direction across Shyngyrlau District, forming meanders within a floodplain. Shortly after Karasu village it bends southwards for a stretch until its mouth in the northern shore of lake Zhaltyrkol, located among other salt lakes. The Buldyrty river flows roughly parallel to the Olenti to the northwest and the Kaldygaity to the southeast.

In some places there are sand dunes stretching along both banks. The river is fed by snow and rain.

See also
List of rivers of Kazakhstan

References

External links

Rivers of the West Kazakhstan region.

Rivers of Kazakhstan
West Kazakhstan Region
Endorheic basins of Asia
Ural basin
Caspian Depression